Hui Cao (曹蕙) is a Chinese American physicist who is the Professor of Applied Physics, a Professor of Physics and a Professor of Electrical Engineering at Yale University. Her research interests are mesoscopic physics, complex photonic materials and devices, with a focus on non-conventional lasers and their unique applications. She is an elected member of the US National Academy of Sciences and of the American Academy of Arts and Sciences.

Early life and education 
Cao became interested in physics as a young child, when her father, a professor of physics at Peking University, asked her what travels furthest and fastest. When she learned that the answer was light, she became fascinated by the discipline of optics. Cao earned her undergraduate degree in physics at Peking University. She moved to the United States for her graduate studies, where she joined Princeton University as a graduate student in mechanical & aerospace engineering. She enjoyed the focus of the United States' training on independent, inquisitive thinking. After completing her master's degree, Cao joined Stanford University as a PhD student in applied physics. At Stanford she worked on semiconductor cavity quantum electrodynamics with Yamamoto Yoshihisa. Her doctoral research was published as a monograph by Springer Publishing. She and co-workers proposed a novel exciton-polariton light-emitting diode.

Research and career 
After receiving her PhD degree from Stanford University in 1997, Cao joined the physics faculty at Northwestern University. Whilst she was still interested in quantum electrodynamics, she started to explore new research area and launched a collaboration with Robert P. H. Chang studying the optical properties of zinc oxide. At the time, people were interested in creating ultraviolet lasers out of zinc oxide, but struggled to make a laser cavity with zinc oxide which is difficult to cleave or etch. Whilst measuring the fluorescence of polycrystalline zinc oxide films, Cao observed lasing; an unexpected result given the absence of any cavity. She later attributed this lasing to the random scattering of light from the zinc oxide grains. Cao switched her research focus to random lasers - the lasers with feedback provided by multiple scattering events. Cao also employed the interference of multiply scattered light as a novel mechanism for three-dimensional optical confinement and fabricated microlasers with ZnO nanoparticles. Since 2008, Cao served as the American Physical Society Division of Laser Science Distinguished Traveling Lecturers.    

In 2008 Cao joined Yale University as a Professor of Applied Physics and a Professor of Physics. In collaboration with Michael A. Choma at Yale medical school, she applied her understanding of random lasing systems to the design of novel illumination sources for speckle-free imaging. In conventional lasers, high spatial coherence can result in artefacts such as speckle noise, which can compromise full-field imaging. While having similar brightnesses to conventional lasers, random lasers can have low spatial coherence like light emitting diodes (LEDs) and avoid speckle noise in full-field imaging and parallel projection. Random lasers are simple to fabricate, as they are made of disordered materials. Cao also developed the light sources for optical coherence tomography for biomedical applications. She designed a novel laser system that can switch between high and low spatial coherence, allowing for both speckle-free imaging (to monitor the structure of an object) and speckle-full imaging (to track the motion of an object). She applied such a laser to imaging the heartbeat of a living tadpole, which is an animal model of human heart disease.

In addition, Cao studied other types of non-conventional lasers, including chaotic microcavity lasers, deterministic aperiodic lasers, photonic amorphous lasers, and topological defect lasers. She worked with A. Douglas Stone on a new mathematical theory to model such laser systems. Cao and Stone were the first researchers to create an anti-laser; a device in which incoming beams of light interfere with one another and cancel the outgoing waves. Cao dubbed these devices coherent perfect absorbers (CPAs), and proposed that they can be used as optical switches and radiology. She also showed that it is possible to control light transmission and absorption in opaque media by shaping the spatial wavefronts of laser beams.

After moving to Yale, Cao started the biophotonics program and established collaborations with several biologists and material scientists. In collaboration with Richard Prum and Eric Dufresne, she figured out how the vivid color of bird feather is produced by nanostructures instead of pigments. Together with Antonia Monterio, Cao studied the evolution of the structural color and how it is affected by the environment. She was able to control lasing in biomimetic structures with short-range order.

In 2012 Cao demonstrated that a multimode fiber can function as an ultra-high-resolution broadband spectrometer. The speckle pattern, generated by interference among the guided modes in a fiber, is unique for each wavelength and can be used as a fingerprint to identify the spectral content of the input light. In 2013, Cao realised a high-resolution microspectrometer on a disordered photonic chip. She fabricated a random array of air holes in a silicon wafer. Multiple-scattering events within the random structure allows for tiny, high resolution spectrometers that can be used for a variety of applications.

Alongside the novel photonic devices, Cao made use of non-conventional lasers for high power, stable lasing systems. In collaboration with Ortwin Hess at Imperial College London and Qijie Wang at Nanyang Technological University, she utilized wave-chaotic cavities as well as disordered cavities to disrupt the formation of filaments. Filaments can lead to instabilities during laser operation, and Cao has shown that introducing wave chaos to a laser resonator can significantly improve the emission stability.

In 2018 Cao was named the Yale University Beinecke Professor of Applied Physics, and in 2019 the John C. Malone Professor of Applied Physics and of Physics. She has been a member of the International Scientific Committee of ESPCI Paris since 2017, and a member of the advisory board of the Max Planck Institute for the Science of Light.

Awards and honours 
 2001 National Science Foundation CAREER Award
 2000 Sloan Research Fellowship
 2004 Alexander von Humboldt Foundation Friedrich Wilhelm Bessel Research Award
 2006 American Physical Society Maria Goeppert-Mayer Award
 2007 Elected Fellow of the American Physical Society
 2007 Elected Fellow of The Optical Society of America
 2013 John Simon Guggenheim Fellowship
 2014 Microscopy Today Innovation Award
 2015 Willis E. Lamb Award for Laser Science
 2017 Elected Fellow of American Association for the Advancement of Science
 2019 Elected Fellow of the Institute of Electrical and Electronics Engineers
 2021 Elected to the National Academy of Sciences
 2021 Elected to the American Academy of Arts and Sciences
 2021 IEEE Photonics Society (IPS) Aron Kressel Award
 2022 Rolf Landauer Medal, the International ETOPIM Association

Select publications

References 

Peking University alumni
Princeton University School of Engineering and Applied Science alumni
Stanford University alumni
Northwestern University faculty
Yale University faculty
21st-century American physicists
Fellows of the American Association for the Advancement of Science
Fellows of Optica (society)
Members of the United States National Academy of Sciences
Chinese emigrants to the United States
21st-century American women scientists
Sloan Fellows
American women physicists
Year of birth missing (living people)
Living people
American women academics